A disulfiram-like drug is a drug that causes  an adverse reaction to alcohol leading to nausea, vomiting, flushing, dizziness, throbbing headache, chest and abdominal discomfort, and general hangover-like symptoms among others.  These effects are caused by accumulation of acetaldehyde, a major but toxic metabolite of alcohol formed by the enzyme alcohol dehydrogenase. The reaction has been variously termed a disulfiram-like reaction, alcohol intolerance, and acetaldehyde syndrome.

The prototypical drug of this group is disulfiram (brand name Antabuse), which acts as an acetaldehyde dehydrogenase inhibitor, preventing the metabolism of acetaldehyde into acetic acid, and is used in the treatment of alcoholism. A variety of other drugs cause disulfiram-like reactions upon consumption of alcohol as unintended drug interactions and side effects. Many disulfiram-like drugs act as inhibitors of acetaldehyde dehydrogenase similarly to disulfiram. However, some do not act via inhibition of this enzyme, and instead act via other, poorly elucidated mechanisms.

Unlike acetaldehyde dehydrogenase inhibitors and other disulfiram-like drugs, alcohol dehydrogenase inhibitors such as fomepizole (brand name Antizol) inhibit the metabolism of alcohol into acetaldehyde, thereby increasing and extending the effects of alcohol and reducing its toxicity. As such, they can be thought of as converses of disulfiram-like drugs. Fomepizole is used medically as an antidote against methanol and ethylene glycol poisoning.

List of agents

Intended
Drugs which cause disulfiram-like reactions upon ingestion of alcohol as an intended effect include:

 Calcium carbimide
 Disulfiram
 Hydrogen cyanamide

Unintended
Drugs which cause disulfiram-like reactions upon ingestion of alcohol as an unintended effect include:

 Abacavir
 Cephalosporins such as cefamandole, cefmenoxime, cefmetazole, cefonicid, cefoperazone, cefotetan, ceftriaxone, and latamoxef (moxalactam); thought to be due to common N-methylthiotetrazole metabolite.
 Chloral hydrate
 Chloramphenicol
 Cotrimoxazole (trimethoprim/sulfamethoxazole)
 Ethacrynic acid
 Griseofulvin
 Hydrazines such as isoniazid and procarbazine
 Ketoconazole
 Macrolide immunosuppressants such as pimecrolimus and tacrolimus
 Mepacrine (quinacrine)
 Nilutamide
 Nitrovasodilators (nitrates) such as nitroglycerin
 Nitroimidazoles such as benznidazole, metronidazole, ornidazole, and tinidazole
 Pargyline
 Phenacetin
 Phentolamine
 Phenylbutazone
 Procarbazine
 Propranolol
 Sulfiram
 Sulfonamides
 Sulfonylureas such as chlorpropamide, glibenclamide (glyburide), and tolbutamide
 Tolazoline

Natural
Natural compounds and species which have been found to cause disulfiram-like reactions upon ingestion of alcohol include:

 Coprine, via active metabolite 1-aminocyclopropanol; found in mushrooms such as Ampulloclitocybe clavipes (club-footed clitocybe), Coprinus atramentarius (common inkcap), and Imperator torosus (brawny bolete) among others
Kudzu (Pueraria lobata)
 Coprinopsis atramentaria

List of agents previously thought to cause disulfiram-like reactions

 Metronidazole

See also
 Alcohol intolerance

References

External links

Alcohol
Alcohol abuse
Alcohol and health
 
Substance-related disorders